This is a list of Samoan Twenty20 International cricketers.

In April 2018, the ICC decided to grant full Twenty20 International (T20I) status to all its members. Therefore, all Twenty20 matches played between Samoa and other ICC members after 1 January 2019 will have T20I status.

This list comprises all members of the Samoa cricket team who have played at least one T20I match. It is arranged in alphabetical order by last name from Samoa's first Twenty20 International. Samoa played their first matches with T20I status during the 2019 Pacific Games, which took place from 8 to 13 July 2019 in Apia, Samoa.

Key

List of players
Statistics are correct as of 18 March 2023.

References 

Samoa
T20I